Nunchukka Superfly is a punk band from Sydney. It was formed by Peter Black and Ray Ahn from Hard-Ons with Joel Ellis.

Discography
Nunchukka Superfly (1999)
There Are No Accidents ... Just Fuckwits (2001)
III (2004)
If Ya Not Careful With Electricity It Will Kill Ya (2008) – Chatterbox Records

References

New South Wales musical groups